Gurik is a rural locality (a selo) and the administrative centre of Guriksky Selsoviet, Tabasaransky District, Republic of Dagestan, Russia. The population was 804 as of 2010. There are 7 streets.

Geography 
Gurik is located 4 km northwest of Khuchni (the district's administrative centre) by road. Lyakhe is the nearest rural locality.

References 

Rural localities in Tabasaransky District